is a Japanese football player.

Club statistics
Updated to end of 2018 season.

References

External links
Profile at Machida Zelvia

1992 births
Living people
Shoin University alumni
Association football people from Kanagawa Prefecture
Japanese footballers
J1 League players
J2 League players
J3 League players
Japan Football League players
Shonan Bellmare players
Fukushima United FC players
Thespakusatsu Gunma players
FC Machida Zelvia players
Renofa Yamaguchi FC players
FC Gifu players
Association football midfielders